Subedar Sukhdev Singh, SM was a Junior Commissioned Officer (JCO) in the Indian Army. He served in the 16 Grenadiers battalion. On 5th October 2021, he got martyred in action during a cross-border firing at Nowshera Sector in Rajouri district, Jammu and Kashmir. He was posthumously awarded the Sena Medal. During his service, he also took part in the 1999 Kargil War.

Biography

Early life 
Sukhdev was born in Subedar Sukhdev Singh was born in Peoni village in Udhampur district, Jammu and Kashmir. He joined the Army after finishing his schooling.

Career 
He joined the indian army as a Non Commissioned Officer (NCO). He was recruited in the Grenadiers’ 16th Battalion. Being deployed in the Kargil Sector, he also took part in the 1999 Kargil war. Later, following the promotions, he was became JCO. In 2020, he was promoted from Naib Subedar to Subedar rank. He was Killed In Action (KIA) on 9 October 2020 during a cross-border firing with Pakistan along the LoC in Nowshera, Jammu and Kashmir.

Sena Medal 
He was given the Sena Medal on 15th August 2021 (75th Independence Day) for his bravery and leadership.

References 

Indian Army officers
People of the Kargil War
Recipients of the Sena Medal
2020 deaths
People from Udhampur district